German submarine U-1166 was a Type VIIC/41 U-boat of Nazi Germany's Kriegsmarine during World War II.

She was ordered on 14 October 1941, and was laid down on 4 February 1943, at Danziger Werft AG, Danzig, as yard number 138. She was launched on 28 August 1943, and commissioned under the command of Oberleutnant zur See Herbert Wagner on 8 December 1943.

Design
German Type VIIC/41 submarines were preceded by the heavier Type VIIC submarines. U-1166 had a displacement of  when at the surface and  while submerged. She had two shafts and two  propellers.

U-1166 was fitted with five  torpedo tubes (four fitted at the bow and one at the stern), fourteen torpedoes or 26 TMA or TMB Naval mines, one  SK C/35 naval gun, (220 rounds), one  Flak M42 and two  C/30 anti-aircraft guns. The boat had a complement of between forty-four and fifty-two.

Service history
On 28 July 1944, U-1166 was badly damaged in a torpedo explosion. She was later decommissioned in Kiel on 28 August 1944, and converted to a floating power station. On 3 May 1945, U-1166 was scuttled at the Deutsche Werke shipyard in Kiel off of dry dock No. 2. Her wreck was raised and broken up.

See also
 Battle of the Atlantic

References

Bibliography

German Type VIIC/41 submarines
U-boats commissioned in 1943
World War II submarines of Germany
1943 ships
Ships built in Danzig
Maritime incidents in July 1944
Operation Regenbogen (U-boat)
U-boats scuttled in 1945